At least three warships of Japan have borne the name Tone:

 , a protected cruiser; participated in the World War I Siege of Tsingtao; stricken in 1931 and sunk as an aircraft target in 1933
 , an  launched in 1991

Japanese Navy ship names
Imperial Japanese Navy ship names